Maigetter Peak is a rock peak, the northernmost of the Birchall Peaks, on the south shore of Block Bay in Marie Byrd Land, Antarctica. It was discovered by the Byrd Antarctic Expedition (1928–30) and plotted from photos taken on the flight of December 5, 1929. The peak was mapped by the United States Geological Survey from surveys and U.S. Navy air photos (1959–65), and was named by the Advisory Committee on Antarctic Names for Robert Z. Maigetter, a biologist with the United States Antarctic Research Program Marie Byrd Land Survey II, 1967–68.

References

Mountains of Marie Byrd Land